Mount Batu is one of the highest of the Bale Mountains of Ethiopia, as well as of the Oromia Region. It consists of two peaks, Tinnish Batu ("Little Batu"), which is actually higher than Tilliq Batu ("Big Batu") to the south. The reason for these deceptive names is explained by Paul Henze, who reports that upon viewing them, "it appeared that the peak behind Tinnish Batu was definitely higher."

The first European to climb Mount Batu was the Finnish professor Helmer Smeds, who accomplished this feat in 1958.

Notes 

Mountains of Ethiopia
Bale Mountains
Four-thousanders of Africa